Magnolia Township may refer to:

 Magnolia Township, Columbia County, Arkansas, in Columbia County, Arkansas
 Magnolia Township, Putnam County, Illinois
 Magnolia Township, Harrison County, Iowa
 Magnolia Township, Rock County, Minnesota
 Magnolia Township, Duplin County, North Carolina, in Duplin County, North Carolina

Township name disambiguation pages